Yerkebulan Muratuly Tungyshbayev  (Erkebūlan Mūratūly Tūñğyşbaev; born 14 January 1995) is a Kazakh footballer who plays as a midfielder for FC Ordabasy in the Kazakhstan Premier League.

Career

Club
Tungyshbayev started his career in the youth team of FC Ordabasy before joining FC Kyran on loan for the 2013 season. On 7 January 2019, Tungyshbayev moved to FC Kairat, signing a three-year contract.

On 12 March 2021, Tungyshbayev returned to Ordabasy.

Career statistics

Club

International

Statistics accurate as of match played 15 November 2018

International goals

Scores and results list Kazakhstan's goal tally first.

References

External links

Living people
1995 births
FC Ordabasy players
Kazakhstani footballers
Kazakhstan international footballers
Kazakhstan Premier League players
People from Shymkent
Association football midfielders